Kate Alice Manne (born 1983) is an Australian philosopher, associate professor of philosophy at Cornell University, and author. Her work is primarily in feminist philosophy, moral philosophy, and social philosophy.

Education and career
Born in Australia in 1983, Manne grew up in Cottles Bridge, Victoria. Her father Robert Manne was a political science professor at La Trobe University, and her mother Anne Manne (née Robinson) is an author.

As an undergraduate, Manne studied philosophy, logic, and computer science, at the University of Melbourne (2001–2005), earning a BA (Honours) in philosophy. She received her PhD in philosophy from the Massachusetts Institute of Technology (2006–2011). Her dissertation, Not by reasons alone, argued in part that "the practical reason is not a suitable master concept in ethics, let alone the only ethical notion we need."

From 2011 to 2013, Manne was a junior fellow at the Harvard Society of Fellows. Since 2013, she has been at the Sage School of Philosophy, Cornell University, where she is an associate professor. Prospect Magazine named Manne one of the world's top 50 thinkers of 2019.

Philosophical work
Manne has written articles in moral philosophy and metaethics, as well as two books, Down Girl: The Logic of Misogyny (Oxford University Press, 2017) and Entitled: How Male Privilege Hurts Women (Crown Publishing Group, 2020).
 
Down Girl proposes a distinction between sexism and misogyny. Manne argues that "sexism is an ideology that supports patriarchal social relations". Sexism, then, accepts gender roles, and helps to reinforce them, by making them seem as if they were natural or given arrangements. In essence, sexism is a belief system. Misogyny can be understood as an effort to control and punish women "who challenge male dominance". On this definition, misogyny is not necessarily about male hostility or hatred toward women, but more "the law enforcement branch of the patriarchy". According to Manne, "Misogyny is a way women are kept in (patriarchal) order, by imposing social costs for those breaking role or rank, and warning others not to." Manne coins the term "himpathy", which she defines as "the inappropriate and disproportionate sympathy powerful men often enjoy in cases of sexual assault, intimate partner violence, homicide and other misogynistic behavior".

Manne's second book, Entitled: How Male Privilege Hurts Women, explores male privilege. It proposes that male entitlement to sex, power, and knowledge has grave and deadly consequences for society at large, and women more specifically. The book received mixed reviews. Nesrine Malik of The Guardian praised it, writing, "with perspicacity and clear, jargon-free language, Manne keeps elevating the discussion to show how male privilege isn’t just about securing and hoarding spoils from women, but an entire moral framework." Reviewing it for The Chronicle of Higher Education, Anastasia Berg criticized Manne for poorly interpreting the incel phenomenon. Berg argues that to claim that incels police the norms of the patriarchal order is "a gross simplification," since they perceive themselves as the victims of the patriarchal hierarchies that exclude them. Berg also questioned Manne’s “perception of continuity from mansplainer to murderer” and compared Manne's pessimism as well as her injunction not to bother with trying to convince those who are not already “of a similar mind” to the attitudes expressed on incel forums.

Selected publications

Books

Articles

“Melancholy Whiteness: Or, Shame-Faced in Shadows,” Philosophy and Phenomenological Research, January 2018, Volume 96(1): 233–242.
“Locating Morality: Moral Imperatives as Bodily Imperatives,” Oxford Studies in Metaethics, Vol. 12, 2017, ed. Russ Shafer-Landau, Oxford: Oxford University Press.
“Humanism: A Critique,” Social Theory and Practice, April 2016, Volume 42(2): 389–415.
“Democratizing Humeanism,” in Weighing Reasons, eds. Barry Maguire and Errol Lord, New York: Oxford University Press, 2016.
“Tempered Internalism and the Participatory Stance,” in Motivational Internalism, eds. Gunnar Björnsson, Caj Strandberg, Ragnar Francén Olinder, John Eriksson, and Fredrik Björklund, Oxford: Oxford University Press, 2015.
“Disagreeing about How to Disagree,” with David Sobel, Philosophical Studies, April 2014, Volume 168(3): 823–834.
“Internalism about Reasons: Sad but True?” Philosophical Studies, January 2014, Volume 167(1): 89–117.
“Non-Machiavellian Manipulation and the Opacity of Motive,” in Manipulation: Theory and Practice, eds. Michael Weber and Christian Coons, Oxford: Oxford University Press, 2014.
“On Being Social in Metaethics,” Oxford Studies in Metaethics, Vol. 8, 2013, ed. Russ Shafer-Landau, Oxford: Oxford University Press.

References

External links
 
 

1983 births
Australian feminist writers
Australian women philosophers
Analytic philosophers
Cornell University faculty
Living people
Feminist philosophers
University of Melbourne alumni
MIT School of Humanities, Arts, and Social Sciences alumni
21st-century Australian philosophers
21st-century Australian women writers
People from Victoria (Australia)
Australian expatriates in the United States